The Senior League World Series is a baseball tournament for adolescence aged 13 to 16 years old that began in 1961. In 2017, the tournament was moved from Bangor, Maine to Easley, South Carolina. (Easley was the site of the Big League World Series from 2001 to 2016. The Big League division was discontinued after the 2016 Big League World Series.) It is patterned after the Little League World Series, which was named for the World Series in Major League Baseball since 2002.

The Senior League World Series is one of seven tournaments sponsored by Little League International. Each of them brings baseball or softball teams from around the world together in one of four age divisions. The tournament structure for each division's World Series is similar to that used for the Little League Baseball World Series.

Tournament format

The six United States regions are:
Central
East
Host
Southeast
Southwest
West 

The six International regions are:
Asia–Pacific
Australia
Canada
Caribbean
Europe–Africa
Latin America

The teams are placed into two six-team modified-double-elimination brackets based on geography (US and International) The semi-final winners play for the championship, televised on a network of ESPN. All semi-final and championship matches are single-elimination games. 

From 2002 to 2014, a pool-play format was used. Beginning in 2015, each pool plays a modified double-elimination format until only 2 teams remain in each pool. The two remaining teams in their respective pools then play in a single-elimination, semi-final match, with the two winning teams playing in the championship. From 1967–2002 the tournament was straight double-elimination, from 1961–66 it was single–elimination. From 1990 to 2001, a placement bracket was used to determine third place.

Before 2017, the Senior League was the only division of Little League that did not sort teams based on geography.

Locations
The Senior League World Series has been held at eight different sites.

Champions

Championship tally

Championships won by country/state

See also
List of Little League World Series champions by division

References

External links
Senior League Baseball World Series official website

 
Baseball in South Carolina
Sports competitions in South Carolina
Upstate South Carolina
Annual sporting events in the United States
Recurring sporting events established in 1961